HESS J1857+026 is a pulsar wind nebula located approximately  from Earth in the constellation of Aquila.

HESS J1857+026 releases γ-rays in the range of 0.8−45 TeV. It is most likely powered by PSR J1856+0245, a pulsar located nearby.

References

Pulsar wind nebulae
Aquila (constellation)